Balkana (Bosnian/Serbian cyrillic: Балкана) is an artificial lake located on the slopes of Lisina mountain, in the municipality of Mrkonjić Grad, entity of Republika Srpska, in the western part of Bosnia and Herzegovina. The lake, actually, consists of two separate, though connected via small outcomes, basins, upper as larger and lower as smaller, with very small difference in water tables levels.
Balkana gets its waters from several mountain springs and two small mountain streams, Cjepalo and Skakavac, while its outflow is Crna Rijeka (English: Black River), which runs through Mrkonjić Grad from south to north, and joins Vrbas after .

Name
Balkana means of the Balkan peninsula.

See also
List of lakes of Bosnia and Herzegovina

References

Lakes of Bosnia and Herzegovina
Landforms of Republika Srpska
Mrkonjić Grad